Raymond "Ray" Platte (September 3, 1925 – July 21, 1963) was a NASCAR Grand National driver from the American town of Norfolk, Virginia.

Platte only competed in the 1955 Southern 500, racing for Harry Parry in a Chevrolet with a 25th-place finish.  In the process, he won $100 ($ when adjusted for inflation) for his single-race NASCAR career.

The "Virginia Gentleman" crashed into a wall during a 100-lap race at South Boston Speedway, sustaining a skull fracture.  He died the following day.

References

External links
 

1925 births
1963 deaths
Sportspeople from Norfolk, Virginia
Racing drivers from Virginia
NASCAR drivers
Racing drivers who died while racing
Sports deaths in Virginia